The 2003 WNBA season was the seventh season for the Charlotte Sting. The team qualified for the playoffs for the 6th and last time in franchise history, losing the opening round in a sweep to the Connecticut Sun.

Offseason

Dispersal Draft

WNBA Draft

Regular season

Season standings

Season schedule

Player stats

References

Charlotte Sting seasons
Charlotte
Charlotte Sting